The Cape Government Railways 3rd Class 4-4-0 of 1903 was a South African steam locomotive from the pre-Union era in the Cape of Good Hope.

In 1903, the Cape Government Railways placed the last eight 3rd Class Wynberg Tender locomotives with a 4-4-0 American type wheel arrangement in suburban service in Cape Town. While they appeared to be virtually identical to the locomotives of 1901 at first glance, they were heavier and more powerful.

Manufacturer

The last eight  Wynberg Tender passenger locomotives for suburban service in Cape Town were introduced on the Cape Government Railways (CGR) in 1903. Like the Wynberg Tenders of 1901, they were built by Sharp, Stewart and Company. It would appear that their numbering was used as an opportunity to perform some gap-filling on the CGR engine number roster.

These locomotives were very similar in design and appearance to the six CGR 3rd Class 4-4-0 engines of 1901, but Cape Government Railways Chief Locomotive Superintendent H.M. Beatty had revisited his earlier designs which resulted in a larger and more powerful locomotive. The main differences were:
 The wheelbase of the coupled wheels, the engine itself and the engine-and-tender were longer and, as a result, the overall length was longer.
 The engine and tender were both heavier, with a heavier axle load. 
 The tender had a larger water capacity.
 The boiler pitch was raised.
 The grate area and the tube and firebox heating areas were larger.

Service

Cape Government Railways
These locomotives were also known as Wynberg Tenders. They were fast and reliable and performed well on the Simon's Town line. Some were later transferred to Port Elizabeth, where they were employed on the inter-urban passenger trains to Uitenhage.

South African Railways
When the Union of South Africa was established on 31 May 1910, the three Colonial government railways (CGR, Natal Government Railways and Central South African Railways) were united under a single administration to control and administer the railways, ports and harbours of the Union. Although the South African Railways and Harbours came into existence in 1910, the actual classification and renumbering of all the rolling stock of the three constituent railways were only implemented with effect from 1 January 1912.

In 1912, even though they were less than ten years old, these locomotives were also considered obsolete by the South African Railways (SAR), designated Class 03 and renumbered by having the numeral "0" prefixed to their existing numbers. In SAR service, they continued to work suburban trains in Cape Town. Some were later transferred to Germiston, where they were adapted to work the push-pull railmotor trains which ran between Germiston and Wattles until that line was electrified. 

Despite being considered obsolete, all eight engines survived until c. 1918. Two were withdrawn from service between 1918 and 1931, while the rest survived in service until after 1931.

Works numbers
The works numbers, original numbers and renumbering of the Cape 3rd Class of 1903 are shown in the table.

Illustration

References

0310
0310
4-4-0 locomotives
2′B n2 locomotives
Sharp Stewart locomotives
Cape gauge railway locomotives
Railway locomotives introduced in 1903
1903 in South Africa
Scrapped locomotives